The Seton Hall Pirates women's volleyball program is the NCAA Division I intercollegiate volleyball program of Seton Hall University in South Orange, New Jersey. The team competes in the Big East Conference and plays their home games in Walsh Gymnasium on the Seton Hall campus.

2014 season

Regular season
The Seton Hall women's volleyball team finished 2nd in regular season conference play behind Creighton University.

Post-season

Big East Championship
At the Big East Championship tournament, Seton Hall beat Marquette University (3-2) in the first round and went on to play Creighton for the title, where the team fell short of winning the Big East Championship (3-1).

NCAA tournament
The team went on to earn their first ever NCAA tournament berth in program history. Seton Hall faced off against 12th ranked Brigham Young University in the first round of the NCAA tournament, falling to the Cougars (3-0) in Tucson, Arizona.

Awards

Big East Libero of the year
2012 - Alyssa Warren

2013 - Alyssa Warren

2014 - Tessa Fournier

Big East scholar athlete of the year
2014 - Shelbey Manthorpe

Big East coaching staff of the year
2014 - Head Coach: Allison Yaeger, Assistant Coach: Alexandra Matters

First Team All-Big East
2012 - Shelbey Manthorpe

2013 - Alyssa Warren

2014 - Tessa Fournier, Shelbey Manthorpe, Stacey Manthorpe

Second Team All-Big East
2012 - Stacey Manthorpe, Alyssa Warren

2013 - Shelbey Manthorpe, Stacey Manthorpe

2014 - Amanda Hansen

See also
List of NCAA Division I women's volleyball programs

References

External links